King's Quest is an episodic video game series developed by The Odd Gentlemen and published by Activision under the Sierra Entertainment brand name for Microsoft Windows, PlayStation 3, PlayStation 4, Xbox 360 and Xbox One. It is a new re-imagining of the long-running King's Quest series. While it is an adventure game like the previous games in the series, the interface is not fully point-and-click (the PC version only uses point-and-click for the dialogue and first person scenes).

The game is one of several attempts at resurrecting or rebooting the King's Quest franchise since 1998, and its first chapter was released some 32 years after King's Quest I. The new chapters are seen as neither a remake nor necessarily a sequel but a "re-imagining" (the original games are considered to be part of the canon of the new series, as each chapter will take place between those games, but previous games may be reinterpreted in completely new ways).

Gameplay 
Unlike the classic King's Quest video games, the new King's Quest is not a point-and-click adventure. Instead, it is an adventure game that tasks players to control Graham, who ventures to different places to become a knight. The movement of Graham can be completely controlled by players. According to Matt Korba, the game's creative director, the game's controls focuses on "one-button context". As a result, the game does not have any complicated interfaces or controls. Throughout the game, players can interact with different objects in the environment. For instance, players can pick up, gather, and inspect different scenery items. They can switch to first-person perspective when inspecting them.

The game is narrated by the elderly King Graham and his granddaughter Gwendolyn. Players' actions in the game change the narrative. For instance, performing certain actions unlocks additional dialogue. When players make wrong decisions and die, Graham replies with phrases such as "That's what would have happened if I did that", before players re-spawn. Players also make decisions throughout the game that are divided into three different approaches, bravery, wisdom, and compassion. Actions performed by players have consequences and impact the game's story, and as a result, change the game's overall experience. Most of these choices are game play-based. According to Korba, all the choices made by Graham are heroic, and there is no way for players to build a "bad" Graham.

The first section of the game is linear, i.e., levels open sequentially. Players are free to explore levels, and the game does not feature any prescribed or predetermined paths. Players can also use a variety of methods to complete their objectives, and are tasked to solve various puzzles in the game, even though there are no fixed solutions to these puzzles. Players can also have conversations with anyone in the game. The game features branching dialogue. In addition, the game features some action sequences, quick-time events, and on-rail platform elements.

Plot 
In King's Quest, King Graham shares his previous adventures with his curious granddaughter, Gwendolyn. It is through these tales that Gwendolyn learns about the life led by her grandfather.

Along with new stories, the series re-imagines certain events, elements and backstories from previous games. Some of Graham's backstory even differs from that given in Sierra's previous material. Rather than having grown up in Daventry, he is now an outsider that has recently come to the land. The main tale of Chapter I, according to Graham, is from the time when he was but a lad, before he was a knight, and before he came to Daventry for the first time from Llewdor. He has only read about Daventry from travel guides he used to read as a child, and could not wait to see its famous landmarks for himself (the kingdom is reimagined as a bustling walled city surrounding Castle Daventry, where as in the original game the castle was a lonely keep, surrounded by mostly wilderness).

Classic games as well as The King's Quest Companion are reused for references and reimagined events including places from the expanded universe. Chapter 1'''s prologue reimagines events from King's Quest I: Quest for the Crown and focuses on the Mirror of the three treasures as the main treasure Edward sent Graham on to become king of Daventry (as it had been the only treasure stolen from him), the events of the dragon's lair from the King's Quest I are completely reimagined as an action sequence involving being chased by the dragon, and having to make a final choice on how to distract the dragon to escape back up the well to the surface. Later chapters put further focus on the mirror, and point out that he went on separate adventures throughout his life for other treasures as well (including the Shield and Chest), and wants to go on adventures to find even more lost treasures of Daventry even in his old age to save his legacy.

The main is about Graham coming to the kingdom to take part in a Knight Tournament to become a Knight of Daventry, and the winner will also be in the running to become the next king. The story involves Graham having to defeat each of the other knights at various challenges. He befriends one of the knights Achaka, who teaches him how to properly use his bow, but witnesses his death to the dragon (Achaka is often seen to be his 'best' and lost friend throughout the series, even as much as seeing his ghost in the final chapter). Ultimately he defeats the last knight Manny at a game of Wits, and banishes the evil knight from the kingdom.Chapter 3: Once Upon A Climb completely reimagines the events from King's Quest II: Romancing the Throne by taking the story of the princess trapped in the tower by an evil witch Hagatha, but now there are two princesses trapped in the same tower, trapped along with the witch who is herself a princess as well. Graham himself becomes trapped with them in the tower, and has to figure out how to escape. The player ends up choosing between the two princesses (both who will end up the 'canon' Valanice for the player based on whoever is chosen) to be his wife. The synopsis suggests that the original story players may remember was only a fairy tale, and that the new series tells the real and more complicated story.Chapter 4: Snow Place Like Home reimagined elements of King's Quest III: To Heir Is Human, including the details of how Alexander was stolen with the Royal Family (in the original story it is said Alexander had 'disappeared', and no one knew what had happened to him or who had taken him), as well as elements of Alexander's stay in Llewdor. Manannan fled there soon after the kidnapping, with Alexander imprisoned in a mansion. Alexander and Mordon were trained in magic in preparation to conquer Daventry, and usurp the throne.

Alexander eventually escaped by turning his master into a cat, and returned to a relatively peaceful Daventry. Surprising the royal family as they discuss vacation plans, they decide to allow Alexander to accompany them, and ultimately end up travelling to a mysterious Ice Labyrinth. The princess whom the player did not choose turns out to be Icebella (reimagining some of the details from King's Quest V: Absence Makes the Heart Go Yonder). Icebella is ultimately killed by Manny (in the form of a Sphinx). Manny is defeated again by Alexander, who uses a magic cookie to transform him back into a cat. In the end, one of Icebella's ice guardian creations picks up her crown and declares herself the new Icebella (foreshadowing the Icebella Graham would later encounter during his quest in King's Quest V). Mordon ends dropping his "slave name", and changes his name to Mordack, further foreshadowing King's Quest V. Some of Alexander's dialogue also foreshadows events of King's Quest VI: Heir Today, Gone Tomorrow; he mentions that a crystal ball predicted that he would encounter a minotaur in a labyrinth in the future, and that he would encounter a woman with olive skin and green eyes.Chapter 5: The Good Knight takes place late in Graham's life as an elderly man. He has one last encounter with Manny—a chance to prove he is still healthy and sound of mind.  The events of King's Quest V are revised, as well; rather than stonework, the location where Graham and Mordack had their magical duel had wooden floor boards, which he hid under after casting  a fire spell. Similar references are made to King's Quest VI, including the idea that Graham is contemplating his mortality, and his travels to the Realm of the Dead to stand before Samhain (rather than Daventry's afterlife Dimension of Death from King's Quest: Mask of Eternity). One reference in particular shows the gates to Realm of the Dead in their classic digitized-watercolor style. Graham manages to save his kingdom, but is poisoned in the process, and Manny tries to exact his final revenge; Mordack takes pity on Graham (as he had been manipulated and abused by Manannan as well) and saves the king. The former rivals become friends.

The framing story takes place in the last weeks or months of Graham's life while he is bedridden from the poison in Chapter 5. King Graham is relating the tales of his life to his grand-daughter, Gwendolyn, to assist her in becoming a wise and just ruler when he passes on. To ensure that Gwendolyn will be allowed to assume the throne, Graham revises the laws of Daventry, which previously stated that only a male heir could take the throne. As the poison takes its toll, Graham sees the ghost of his old friend Achaka, and begins to forget the details of many of his adventures; Gwendolyn fills in the gaps where possible, and eventually concludes Graham's story by interpreting the events he had already related. Graham passes away later that night, leaving a letter for Gwendolyn to read that urges her to build her own legacy, rather than relying on his.

In the Epilogue, Gwendolyn (presumably the heir to the throne) embarks on her own adventure: the hunt for a yarblesnoof (a turkey-like lizard/dinosaur creature).  Along the way, she encounters Achaka's own granddaughter, Taskia, who arrived in Daventry to defeat a dragon and avenge Achaka. When the two located the dragon, they discover that it's still an infant, innocent of any involvement in Achaka's death. The two befriend the dragon and return to the castle.

 Development 

There were multiple attempts to reboot the franchise following 1998's King's Quest: Mask of Eternity, none of which went past the announcement or concept stages. In August 2014, Activision revived the Sierra brand and had passed development responsibilities for a new game to The Odd Gentlemen. Due to its length, the game was split into multiple chapters with a staggered release schedule. The script for the first chapter alone was 640 pages long, and included branching paths, Easter eggs, narration, object use and interaction, and dialogue trees. Each chapter of the series was longer and more complex than some similar episodic series, such as those made by Telltale Games. The game includes vocal performances by actors Christopher Lloyd, Wallace Shawn, Cherami Leigh, Tom Kenny, Josh Keaton, Maggie Elizabeth Jones, and Zelda Williams.

 Release 
The game was released in five parts in 2015 and 2016, with an optional playable Epilogue only included in King's Quest: The Complete Collection edition. If the first series with Graham does well, future King's Quest series (similar to "seasons") by The Odd Gentlemen would follow other members of the royal family.

 Reception 

 Chapter I: A Knight to Remember Chapter I: A Knight to Remember received positive reviews. Aggregating review website Metacritic gave the Microsoft Windows version 82/100 based on 23 reviews, the PlayStation 4 version 77/100 based on 22 reviews and the Xbox One version 80/100 based on 26 reviews.

 Chapter II: Rubble Without a Cause Chapter II: Rubble Without a Cause received mixed reviews. Metacritic gave the Microsoft Windows version 67/100 based on 7 reviews, the PlayStation 4 version 68/100 based on 12 reviews and the Xbox One version 71/100 based on 11 reviews.

 Chapter III: Once Upon A Climb Chapter III: Once Upon A Climb received positive reviews. Metacritic gave the Microsoft Windows version 78/100 based on 4 reviews, the PlayStation 4 version 79/100 based on 10 reviews and the Xbox One version 80/100 based on 8 reviews.

 Chapter IV: Snow Place Like Home Chapter IV: Snow Place Like Home received mixed reviews. Chris Carter from Destructoid gave this chapter a 9/10 for being "a hallmark of excellence. It may have some flaws, but they are negligible to what is otherwise a supreme title", while Chandler Wood from PlayStation Lifestyle had some mixed feelings about the chapter, giving it 5.5 being happy with "some great cultural references and lines/seeing Graham continue to grow" but generally disliking the "cold and dull environment/boring and dated puzzle design/lack of meaningful choices/underplays capabilities showcased in prior chapters".

 Chapter V: The Good Knight Chapter V: The Good Knight received generally positive reviews. Chris Carter from Destructoid gave this chapter 8.5/10 for an "impressive effort with a few noticeable problems holding it back. Won't astound everyone, but is worth most people's time and cash". Chandler Wood from PlayStation Lifestyle was pleased with this chapter this time around, giving the game 8/10, praising the "deep subjects of mortality, life accomplishments, and what we leave behind/Callbacks to King's Quest'' through the years/Conclusion that pulls the whole saga into context and finishes it out nicely" although being unhappy with the "sudden memory loss" and "some puzzle design is flawed".

References

External links 
 

2015 video games
Adventure games
Episodic video games
King's Quest
PlayStation 3 games
PlayStation 4 games
Sierra Entertainment games
Unreal Engine games
Video games about old age
Video game reboots
Video games about witchcraft
Windows games
Works about vacationing
Xbox 360 games
Xbox One games
Video games developed in the United States